Les Koenning Jr. (born February 10, 1959) is an American football coach. 
During his career, he has served as offensive coordinator for Duke, Houston, Alabama, Texas A&M, South Alabama, Mississippi State, UAB, and most recently, Kansas. He was fired by Les Miles on October 8, 2019 after a loss to Oklahoma.

Coaching career
At Texas A&M, Koenning had called plays from the press box, and coach Dennis Franchione could overrule them, which he did often. In November 2007, the Aggies upset 13th-ranked Texas 38–30, and rumors have it that Franchione did call most plays. Koenning, however, refused to discuss the matter.

After leaving A&M, Koenning was hired by Joey Jones at the University of South Alabama, which was getting ready to play its debut season in 2009.

In December 2008, Dan Mullen, the new head coach at Mississippi State, hired Koenning to coach the offense, though his specific role had not yet been revealed at the time. Mullen announced that Koenning would serve as offensive coordinator in February 2009.
Koenning previously coached receivers at Mississippi State under then-head coach Rockey Felker, during the late 1980s. Though he was replaced after the 1990 season at MSU by Jackie Sherrill, Felker serves today as MSU's director/coordinator of recruiting.

Despite being let go from almost every position Koenning has held, UAB hired Koenning as Offensive Coordinator. His stint lasted only one year. He last firing came as he was fired by Les Miles on October 8, 2019 after a loss to Oklahoma.

Personal life
He is married to the former Lisa Pihl, and has two children Lana Koenning and Les Koenning.

His cousin Vic Koenning has served as a defensive coordinator for several teams, among them Illinois, where he also served as interim head coach.

References

External links
 UAB profile 

1959 births
Living people
American football wide receivers
Alabama Crimson Tide football coaches
Duke Blue Devils football coaches
Houston Cougars football coaches
Louisiana Ragin' Cajuns football coaches
Miami Dolphins coaches
Mississippi State Bulldogs football coaches
Rice Owls football coaches
South Alabama Jaguars football coaches
Southern Miss Golden Eagles football coaches
TCU Horned Frogs football coaches
Texas A&M Aggies football coaches
Texas Longhorns football coaches
Texas Longhorns football players
UAB Blazers football coaches
Sportspeople from San Antonio
Players of American football from San Antonio